The UEFA Women's U-19 Championship 2006 Final Tournament was held in Switzerland between 11–22 July 2006. Germany won the cup after defeating France 3–0 in the final match. Players born after 1 January 1987 were eligible to participate in this competition.

Qualifications
There were two separate rounds of qualifications held before the Final Tournament, beginning with the First Qualifying Round. The first 40 teams were drawn into 10 groups. See UEFA Women's U-19 Championship 2006 (First Qualifying Round).

Top two teams from each group and the five best third-placed team entered in a Second Qualifying Round along with Germany, France and Spain who automatically qualified. The 28 teams were drawn into 7 groups. See UEFA Women's U-19 Championship 2006 (Second Qualifying Round).

Then, the winners of each group joint hosts Switzerland at the Final Tournament.

Final tournament

Group stage

Group A

Group B

Knockout stage

Semifinals

Final

Goalscorers
7 goals
 Elena Danilova

5 goals
 Marie-Laure Delie

3 goals
 Isabel Kerschowski

2 goals

  Emma Madsen
  Ann-Christin Angel
  Nadine Keßler
  Monique Kerschowski

1 goal

  Kristien Elsen
  Nora Coton Pélagie
  Jessica Houara
  Eugénie Le Sommer
  Chloé Mazaloubeaud
  Fatmire Bajramaj
  Anna Blässe
  Friederike Engel
  Juliane Höfler
  Juliane Maier
  Amber van der Heijde
  Elena Terekhova
  Maja Krantz
  Caroline Abbé
  Isabelle Meyer
  Maeva Sarrasin

External links
Section at the UEFA web site

Women
UEFA Women's U-19 Championship
2006
2006
2006 in women's association football
2006–07 in German women's football
2006–07 in French women's football
2006–07 in Danish women's football
2006 in Russian football
2006–07 in Dutch women's football
2006–07 in Belgian football
2006 in Swedish women's football
July 2006 sports events in Europe
2006 in youth association football